Leonardis is a surname. Notable people with the surname include:

Giacomo Leonardis (1723 - 1797) Italian engraver and etcher
Roberto de Leonardis (1913-1984), Italian film script translator, film dialogue writer and film lyricist
Aleš Leonardis, Slovenian professor of computer and information science

See also

Leonardi